HD 3443 is a binary system composed of medium-mass main sequence stars in the constellation of Cetus about  away.

System 
This binary star system, with an orbital semimajor axis 8.9 AU, has not had any circumstellar dust detected as of 2020. While the habitable zones of the stars stretch from 0.55 to 0.95 AU from the stars, planetary orbits with a semimajor axis beyond 1.87 AU would become unstable due to the influence of the binary companion.

Properties 
The star system is enriched in oxygen compared to the Solar System, having 140% of solar oxygen abundance, but is depleted in heavier elements, having 75% of solar abundance of iron.

References 

Binary stars
Cetus (constellation)
J00372057-2446023
CD-25 225
002941
0025
0159
G-type main-sequence stars
K-type main-sequence stars